Mahmoud Afshartous, also written Afshartoos (1907–24 April 1953), was an Iranian general and chief of police during the government of Prime Minister Mohammad Mossadegh. Afshartous was abducted and killed by anti-Mossadegh conspirators led by MI 6 https://en.m.wikipedia.org/wiki/Coup_53 which helped pave the way for the 1953 coup d'état.

Early life and education
Afshartous came from a Persian family which was related to the Qajar dynasty. He was born in Tehran in 1907. He was a graduate of the Officers’ Academy.

Paternal family
His father was Hassan Khan Shebl as-Saltaneh, the eldest son of Mohammad Khan Afshar "Sartip", a notable Qajar officer by Mala Banu Khanom, the widow of Amir Isa Khan Vali Ehtesham ad-Dowleh Qajar-Qovanlou Amir Kabir. Therefore, Hassan Khan was the younger half brother of famous Mehdi Qoli Khan Qajar-Qovanlou Amirsoleymani Majd ad-Dowleh and cousin of Naser al-Din Shah Qajar. 
His career at court began 1868 as page boy (gholam) and he was known as Hassan Khan Afshar "Bashi". Later he became adjutant (Persian ağūdān-e hozūr-e homāyūnī) to Naser al-Din Shah Qajar. Then he received the title Shebl as-Saltaneh (Lion Cub of the Monarchy) from the shah, and accompanied him on several trips. Shebl as-Saltaneh held a number of posts in court administration and he chose the name Afshar-e Tous, i.e. Afshar of the City of Tous, (or Afshartous) when family names were mandated in 1930.

Maternal family
Afshartous' mother was Banou Fatemeh Soltan Khanom, from the Zarrinnaal line of the Zarrin Kafsh tribe (local Persian-Kurdish tribal chiefs and officials). Her father, Agha Mirza Zaman Khan Kordestani, came from Sanandaj in the Iranian province of Kordestān to Naser al-Din Shah's court. As a member of the Ardalanic nobility, he was appointed muster-master (lashkar-nevis) of the troops and married Pari Soltan Khanom Pir-Bastami from the Moayyeri clan (a niece of Naser al-Din Shah). Her brothers, Agha Mirza Ali Akbar Khan Zarrinnaal Nasr-e Lashkar and Mirza Ali Asghar Khan Zarrinkafsh, were successful under the Qajars and the Pahlavi dynasty.

He had seven brothers (Shebl al-Mamalek, Khan-Khanha, Mohammad Sadegh, Mohammad Bagher, Morteza, Mostafa and Ali) and two sisters (Akhtar as-Saltaneh and Banou Ozma) with the surname Afshartous (or Afshartoos), and they married into the Amirsoleymani and Zarrinkafsh families.

Relationship to the Pahlavis
Afshartous was related to the Pahlavi dynasty through Touran Khanom Amirsoleymani (Qajar-Quvanlou) Qamar al-Molouk, third wife of Reza Shah and mother of Prince Gholam Reza Pahlavi. Touran was related to Afshartous' father and a cousin of Afshartous' second wife, Fatemeh Bayat (Mossadegh's grandniece).

Career
After the Persian Constitutional Revolution during the first decade of the 20th century, Afshartous' father became concerned about the political situation in Iran and temporarily left the country in 1909. His uncle Majid ad-Dowleh, the elder of the Qajar dynasty, encouraged him to pursue a military education. After graduating from Nezam High School in Tehran, Afshartous entered military service as a cadet at Tehran Military University. In 1936 he was introduced to Reza Shah by two-star General (sar-lashkar) Karim Buzarjomehri, and got his first job as chief of royal property (amlak-e saltanati). Afshartous later joined the artillery corps, promoted to one-star general (or brigadier-general—sartip) of the Imperial Iranian Forces, headed Reza Shah's funeral procession and made military governor of Tehran by Mohammad Reza Shah Pahlavi. He took steps against corruption in the army, and supported his granduncle Mossadegh's policy by forming the National Front (jebh-e melli). On 23 July 1952, when Mossadegh was prime minister, Afshartous was appointed Iranian chief of police. He was in office until April 1953.

A quiet, firm and disciplined person with few friends, he desired change in the political system of Iran to combat corruption (especially bribery in military):

A loyal supporter of Mossadegh (known as his "right hand") and popular with the people, he became a threat to the political circles around Pahlavi.

Death
When Prime Minister Mohammad Mossadegh (leader of the National Front, a liberal democrat and a nationalist) increasingly governed without parliament to lessen the Shah's power, some politicians feared that his democratic measures would end in despotism. Mossadegh organized a plebiscite to dissolve the parliament. The opposition feared that he would ally with the communist Tudeh party, become a Soviet-influenced dictator and abolish the Iranian monarchy. In March 1953 the imperial court, aided by clergy, expelled army officers and politicians, organized a conspiracy against the prime minister. Mozaffar Baqai, founding member of the Iranian Toilers' party and former Mossadegh associate, allied with General Fazlollah Zahedi (a friend of the Shah) to depose Mossadegh. To prepare for the coup the police apparatus had to be dismantled, and the conspirators met at Baqai's house to plan the murder of the chief of police. Afshartous was kidnapped when he was lured to Hossein Katibi's house for a meeting. He was brought to the mountains near Tehran, tortured and strangled by a group headed by Katibi on 24 April 1953. Khatibi affirmed that Afshartous had documents describing a roundup of US agents and supporters of the Shah. This sealed Afshartous' fate, and the plot against the democratically elected prime minister ended with the CIA-sponsored coup d’etat of 19 August 1953 later known as Operation Ajax.

Afshartous was posthumously promoted to two-star general (or major-general— sar-lashkar) by Mossadegh, and he was buried in Tehran's Tajrish neighborhood at the Reza-Pahlavi-Hospital (known as Afshartous Hospital at the beginning of the 1979 Iranian Revolution, and later Shohada (Martyr) Hospital). The Shah sent his half-brother, Prince Gholam Reza Pahlavi, to Banou Fatemeh Soltan's house to extend condolences from the Pahlavi monarchy. Banou Fatemeh Afshartous, grieving the loss of her son, asked the prince: "I am wondering that my son's murderer sent you to come here. What did my son do wrong than only being a real patriot who loved his country? What did my son do wrong in the eyes of his murderer, the Shah, your brother?" The prince left, and Afshartous' family cut its ties to the imperial court.

References

Further reading
Barjesteh van Waalwijk van Doorn (Khosravani), L.A. Fereydoun: "Mistaken Identities: Anoushirvan (Shir) Khan (Qajar Qovanlu) 'Eyn ol-Molk' 'Etezad od-Doleh' and Prince Ali Qoli Mirza 'Etezad os-Saltaneh'" , in: Journal of the International Qajar Studies Association, Vol. II, Rotterdam 2002, p. 91–150.
Eskadari-Qajar, Manoutchehr M.: Qovanlou Qajar Genealogy, in: The Qajar (Kadjar) Dynasty Pages 
Farman Farmaian, Bahman: "Shirzan – The Lioness. A Narrative Sketch of Princess Malek-Taj Qajar 'Najmeh os-Saltaneh'", in: Qajar Studies: Journal of International Qajar Studies Association, Vol. VIII, Rotterdam 2008, p. 124–147.
Farman-Farmaian, Sattareh; Dona Munker: Daughter of Persia: A Woman's Journey from her Father's Harem through the Islamic Revolution, New York 1992.
Milani, Abbas: Eminent Persians, Syracuse University Press, 2008, Vol 1.
Mo'tazed, Khosrow: Nakaman-e Kakh-e Sa'adabad (The Unlucky of the Sa'adabad Palace), Vol. 2 (2), Tehran 1374 h.š. (2005).
Zarrinkafsch (Bahman-Qajar), Arian K.: "Transition from Tribal Nobility to Urban Elite: the Case of the Kurdish Zarrinnaal Family", in: Qajar Studies: Journal of International Qajar Studies Association, Vol. VIII, Rotterdam 2008, p. 97–123.
Zarrinkafsch (Bahman-Qajar), Arian K.: The Zarrinkafsch (Bahman-Qajar) Webpage

External links

Shajarehnaameh Project
Zarrinkafsch-Bahman (Qajar) family

1907 births
1953 deaths
Assassinated Iranian people
Imperial Iranian Army major generals
People from Tehran